Obiozor is a surname. Notable people with the surname include:

 Christian Obiozor (born 1994), Nigerian footballer
 Cyril Obiozor (born 1986), American football player
 George Obiozor (1942–2022), Nigerian professor and diplomat

Surnames of African origin